Vimbayi Kajese is a Zimbabwean journalist who first came to international attention as a news presenter for China Central Television's CCTV-9 from 2009-2011. She was the first African anchorwoman in the station's history, and her success helped pave the way for the network's expanded presence on the continent, and eventual launch of programs like Africa Live from its Nairobi Bureau which was established in 2012.

Career
Kajese first visited China in 2004, and decided to move to Beijing in 2006. She became one of CCTV-9's early morning news presenters three years later. She also went to North Park Primary School in Mt. Pleasant, Harare. She left CCTV in October 2011, and later began organizing conferences and events aimed at promoting international friendship between various African and Chinese communities, including entrepreneurs and students.

References

External links
Official site

Zimbabwean television presenters
Zimbabwean women television presenters
Zimbabwean journalists
Zimbabwean women journalists
Zimbabwean expatriates in China
Year of birth missing (living people)
Living people
China Central Television
Chinese television presenters
Chinese women television presenters
Chinese journalists
Chinese women journalists
21st-century Zimbabwean writers